Lysandra corydonius, the false chalkhill blue, is a butterfly of the family Lycaenidae. The species is distributed in south-eastern Europe, Caucasus, Transcaucasia, north-eastern Turkey, and north-western Iran.  L.corydonius is very similar to Lysandra coridon but a slight violet sheen is present, especially in the outer area of the wings. .It inhabits a wide variety of grasslands and woodlands. In Armenia it occurs from 1200 to 2000 m above sea level. The known larval host plants of the species in Turkey is Hippocrepis comosa, in the Caucasus - Coronilla varia.
The species has not been assessed for the IUCN Red List. In Armenia from 2003 to 2013 its population increased.

Subspecies
 Lysandra corydonius corydonius (Caucasus, Transcaucasus, north-eastern Turkey, north-western Iran)
 Lysandra corydonius ciscaucasica (Jachontov, 1914) (northern Caucasus, south-eastern Europe)

References

Lysandra (butterfly)
Butterflies of Asia
Butterflies of Europe
Butterflies described in 1852